Andrew James Christoff (born c. 1945) is an American football coach. He was defensive coordinator for 18 seasons at six schools—Idaho, Oregon, Stanford, Notre Dame, Colorado and Cincinnati.

From Ritzville, Washington, Christoff graduated from Ritzville High School in 1963, and was recruited to play at Idaho under head coach Dee Andros. He received a bachelor's degree in education from the University of Idaho in 1967 and a completed master's degree at Oregon State University in 1970.

References

1948 births
Living people
Alabama Crimson Tide football coaches
Cincinnati Bearcats football coaches
Colorado Buffaloes football coaches
Georgia Tech Yellow Jackets football coaches
Idaho Vandals football coaches
Idaho Vandals football players
New Mexico Lobos football coaches
Notre Dame Fighting Irish football coaches
Oregon Ducks football coaches
Oregon State Beavers football coaches
Stanford Cardinal football coaches
UCLA Bruins football coaches
USC Trojans football coaches
VMI Keydets football coaches
People from Ritzville, Washington